We Love 'Em Tonight: Live at Tipitina's is a live album by the New Orleans, LA based band Galactic. Recorded live at Tipitina's Uptown in New Orleans, LA.

Track listing
 "Crazyhorse Mongoose"  – 6:35
 "Moog Marmalade"  – 5:20
 "Bobski/Jeffe 2000"  – 2:48
 "Vilified"  – 3:50
 "I Get Lifted"  – 3:57
 "My Mind Is Hazy"  – 5:17
 "Baker's Dozen"  – 9:27
 "Blue Pepper"  – 5:28
 "Lumpology"  – 4:20
 "Working in the Coal Mine" (Allen Toussaint)  – 2:53
 "Shibuya"  – 9:50
 "Two Clowns"  – 8:56
 "Sweet Leaf" (Ozzy Osbourne, Tony Iommi, Geezer Butler, Bill Ward) – 4:25

Chart performance

Personnel
Galactic:
Theryl DeClouet - vocals (tracks 4, 5, 6, 13)
Ben Ellman - harmonica, saxophone
Robert Mercurio - bass, vocals, photography
Stanton Moore - drums, loops
Richard Vogel - keyboards
Jeff Raines - guitar

Nick Sansano - producer, editing, mixing
Tom Coyne - mastering
Theresa Anderson - background vocals (track 4)
Ethan Allen - engineer
Nick Gamma - art direction
Cyrille Taillandier - digital editing
Elisa Garcia - design

References

External links
 Official Galactic site

Galactic albums
2001 live albums
Volcano Entertainment live albums